David Mark Byttow (born February 12, 1982) is an American Internet entrepreneur who was the co-founder and CEO of the mobile application Secret. In October 2018, it was announced that Byttow is now the director of engineering at Snap, Inc.

Early life and education
Byttow was born and raised in Munster, Indiana and taught himself how to program video games at the age of 10. He dropped out of Purdue University to pursue a career in video game programming.

Career
In 2001, Byttow joined a (now defunct) video game company named CodeFire. After that, he joined The Collective as a gameplay programmer for popular video game consoles. In 2007, Byttow did contract work for Bandai Namco Entertainment on the Xbox 360 and PS3 game Afro Samurai. He then joined Google as a Staff Engineer for five years where he worked on App Engine, Google Wave and Google+. He then joined Square, Inc. as Technical Director and head of Square Wallet. He was at Square for nearly a year before founding Secret (app) with Google-colleague Chrys Bader-Wechseler.

Byttow announced the shut down of Secret (app) on April 29, 2015.

After Secret shut down, Byttow began working on a project called Bold designed to "help teams and companies foster ideas." In 2017, after a few years working to establish this company, Byttow terminated the idea and joined Postmates to lead Product and Engineering for their apps. In October 2018, he joined Snap as its director of engineering. Byttow has taken significant interest in Snapchat since 2014 when he met Evan Spiegel and tried to take Secret in a similar direction as the platform.

See also
 Secret (app)
 Anonymous social media

References

1982 births
Living people
American technology chief executives
American software engineers
Google employees
Video game programmers
People from Munster, Indiana